Pleuni Cornelisse (born 18 October 1999) is a Dutch judoka. She won a silver at the  2021 Judo Grand Prix Zagreb.

On 12 November 2022 she won a silver medal at the 2022 European Mixed Team Judo Championships as part of team Netherlands.

References

External links
 

1999 births
Living people
Dutch female judoka
People from Schagen
Sportspeople from North Holland
20th-century Dutch women
21st-century Dutch women